Georgiyevka is a rural locality (a selo) in Serebropolsky Selsoviet, Tabunsky District, Altai Krai, Russia. The population was 1 as of 2013. There is 1 street.

Geography 
Georgiyevka is located 47 km northeast of Tabuny (the district's administrative centre) by road. Nikolayevka is the nearest rural locality.

References 

Rural localities in Tabunsky District